In cycling, hiking, mountaineering and running, cumulative elevation gain refers to the sum of every gain in elevation throughout an entire trip. It is sometimes also known as cumulative gain or elevation gain, or often in the context of mountain travel, simply gain. Another commonly used phrase is total ascent. Elevation losses are not counted in this measure. Cumulative elevation gain, along with round-trip distance, is arguably the most important value used in quantifying the strenuousness of a trip. This is because hiking  on flat land (zero elevation gain) is significantly easier than hiking up and down a large mountain with the same round-trip distance.

Computation

In the simplest case of a trip where hikers only travel up on their way to a single summit, the cumulative elevation gain is simply given by the difference in the summit elevation and the starting elevation.

However, when climbing a mountain with some "ups-and-downs", or traversing several mountains, one must take into account every "up" along the whole route. This even means that the (usually small) uphills on the descent must be counted. Additionally, this section of the trail on the overall ascent that goes down 250 feet subsequently goes up on the descent, so it is counted as another gain in elevation.

If one hikes over five hills of 100 vertical feet each, the cumulative elevation gain is 5 × = . Only the uphill sections are counted, not the downhills.

This concept explains why travel on terrain which has more frequent and sharp "ups-and-downs", or is generally more rugged, is usually significantly more strenuous even if the highest absolute elevation reached on any peak is not very great.

Technology
Cumulative elevation gain can be recorded using GPS devices such as Garmin or Strava.

See also
 Naismith's rule

References
 Elevation Gain and 5,000+ Foot Elevation Gain Lists
 National Three Peaks Challenge - use of phrase 'total ascent'

Mountaineering
Vertical position
Hiking
Cycling
Running